Dolev Haziza (born 5 July 1995) is an Israeli professional footballer who plays as an attacking midfielder or as a winger for Israeli Premier League club Maccabi Haifa and the Israel national team.

Early life
Haziza was born in Netanya, Israel, to an Israeli family of both Sephardi Jewish and Mizrahi Jewish descent. He grew up in Lod, Israel. Haziza is observant and does not play football on the Jewish high holiday of Yom Kippur.

He also holds a French passport, which eases the move to certain European football leagues.

Club career

Bnei Yehuda Tel Aviv 
He made his senior Israeli Premier League debut for Bnei Yehuda Tel Aviv on 22 August 2015, coming on as a second half substitute, in a 0–3 away victory over Maccabi Haifa.

Maccabi Haifa 
On 20 July 2022, Haziza scored his debut UEFA Champions League qualifiers goal for Israeli side Maccabi Haifa, when he scored in the last minutes of a home match against Greek side Olympiacos that ended in a 1–1 home draw. On 27 July 2022, he assisted the second goal in the return fixture against Olympiacos, helping his team to a 0–4 away victory. On 3 August 2022, he also assisted the fourth goal for Maccabi Haifa in a 4–0 home win against Cypriot side Apollon, during their first leg in the Champions League Third qualifying round.

On 17 August 2022, Haziza assisted all three goals of their 2022–23 UEFA Champions League Play-offs first leg against Serbian side Red Star Belgrade, steering his team to a 3–2 home win. After opening for his Israeli side in the Play-offs second leg against Serbian side Red Star Belgrade during the return fixture that ended in a 2–2 away draw (5–4 in aggregation), Maccabi Haifa received the qualifying ticket to the Champions League Group Stage. Haziza has been officially ranked by UEFA as the most assisting player (5 assists) of the 2022–23 UEFA Champions League qualifiers and play-offs. On 14 September 2022, Haziza assisted his sixth goal in the 2022–23 UEFA Champions League, this time during his team Group stage match against French side Paris Saint-Germain, that ended in a 1–3 home loss for Maccabi Haifa.

International career
He has been a youth international for the Israel U-21 in 2015.

Haziza made his senior international debut on 17 November 2019, during Israel's UEFA Euro 2020 qualifiers, coming on as 42nd substitute against Poland, in a home match that ended in a 1–2 defeat.

Honours 
Bnei Yehuda Tel Aviv
Israeli Liga Leumit: 2014–15
 Israel State Cup: 2016–17, 2018–19

Maccabi Haifa
 Israeli Premier League: 2020–21, 2021–22
 Israel Super Cup: 2021
 Israel Toto Cup (Ligat Ha'Al): 2021–22

See also 
 List of Jewish footballers
 List of Jews in sports
 List of Israelis

References

1995 births
Living people
Israeli footballers
Jewish footballers
Bnei Yehuda Tel Aviv F.C. players
Hapoel Ramat Gan F.C. players
Maccabi Haifa F.C. players
Israel international footballers
Liga Leumit players
Israeli Premier League players
Footballers from Netanya
Footballers from Lod
Israel youth international footballers
Association football midfielders
Association football wingers
Israeli Jews
Israeli people of French-Jewish descent
Sephardi Jews
Mizrahi Jews